The Flora of Malaysia comprises a vast assemblage of plant species estimated to over 15,500 vascular plants. Malaysia boasts 8,019 species of seed plants: 19 species of Gymnosperms and 8,000 Angiosperms. Globally, Malaysia is ranked 14th in terms of species of vascular plants. The Flora of Malaysia consist of approximately 15,000 species of vascular plant. Peninsular Malaysia has around 8,200 species of vascular plants while places such as Sabah and Sarawak has around 12,000 species. Most Flora can be found in the dense rainforest of Malaysia.

Origins

Malaysia was part of the southern supercontinent Gondwana that broke up about 180 million years ago. A major interdigitation of Australian and Malesian flora is estimated to have occur in the late Tertiary and Quaternary time.

Vegetation types
Major forest types in Malaysia are lowland dipterocarp forest, hill dipterocarp forest, low hill dipterocarp forest, oak-laurel forest, montane ericaceous forest, peat swamp forest and mangrove forest. In addition, there also smaller areas of freshwater swamp forest, heath forest, forest on limestone and forest on quartz ridges.

Habitat
The forests in Malaysia are mostly dominated by trees from the dipterocarp forests. The dipterocarp forest occurs on dry land just above sea level to an altitude of around 900 metres. Other than that, the forest canopy is very dense where a small amount of sunlight can penetrate it. Because of that, the undergrowth plants are usually poorly developed and believed to be impenetrable. A large amount of rainforest has been destroyed due to agricultural or commercial purposes, and also by severe wind and lightning storms.

Types of Flora
 Rafflesia:28 Species 
 Hibiscus : 200-250 Species 
 Ixora  : 545 Species 
 Bougainvillea : 18 Species 
 Orchid  : 28,000 Species 
 Allamanda: 15 Species 
 Pterocarpus Indicus-Angsana  : 2 Species 
 Fuchsia : 110 Species 
 Centaurea Cyanus  : 101 Species 
 Plumeria/Frangipani : 4 Species 
 Heliconia/Lobster claws : 40 Species 
 Lantana camara/Big Sage : 650 Species 
 Mimosa Pudica : 400 Species 
 Heliconia: 42 Species 
 Adenanthera Pavonina 
 Rhododendron Vireya : 300 Species 
 Rosa Rugosa : 100 Species 
 Chrysanthemum : 23,000 Species

See also
 Wildlife of Malaysia
 List of plants of Malaysia

References

Flora of Malaysia
Plants